Your World on Fire is the debut full-length album by American rock band In Fear and Faith. It was released January 6, 2009 through Rise Records.

Background
On April 4, 2008, it was announced that the band had signed to independent label Rise Records. It was mentioned that the band would be recording their debut album later in the year with a planned release in November. The following month, the band went on tour with Burden of a Day, For Today and Life in Your Way. They then went on a West Coast tour in June 2008 supporting the Human Abstract. Your World on Fire was recorded in August with producer Andrew Wade at The Wade Studios.

Release
Your World on Fire was released on January 6, 2009. It features re-recorded versions of the songs "The Taste of Regret" and "Live Love Die" (originally from the Voyage EP). The album as well marks the first release by the band to feature their current clean vocalist, Scott Barnes, as opposed to Tyler Smith who left the group one month after the release of Voyage. In January and February 2009, the band supported Gwen Stacy on their headlining US tour. In March, the band supported Stick to Your Guns on their headlining US tour. In May and June, the band went on tour with Sky Eats Airplane, Eyes Set to Kill and the Word Alive.

Track listing

Personnel
In Fear and Faith
 Cody "Duke" Anderson - unclean vocals
 Scott Barnes - clean vocals
 Tyler McElhaney - bass guitar, Samples
 Mehdi Niroomand - drums
 Ramin Niroomand - lead guitar, keyboards and piano
 Noah Slifka - rhythm guitar
 
Additional musicians
Craig Owens - additional vocals on "The Road to Hell Is Paved with Good Intentions"
Jeremy McKinnon - additional vocals on "Strength in Numbers"
Production
Produced by Andrew Wade
Mastering, remastering, vocal engineering by Kris Crummett

References

2009 debut albums
In Fear and Faith albums
Rise Records albums
Albums produced by Andrew Wade